The 1996 United States presidential election in Indiana took place on November 5, 1996 as part of the 1996 United States presidential election. Voters chose 12 representatives, or electors to the Electoral College, who voted for president and vice president.

Indiana was won by Senator Bob Dole (R-KS). The presidential contest in Indiana was not a surprise, with Dole winning 47.13% to 41.55% over President Bill Clinton (D) by a margin of 5.58%. Billionaire businessman Ross Perot (Reform Party of the United States of America-TX) finished in third, with a significant 10.50% of the popular vote. Indiana would stay a Republican state until 2008, in which Barack Obama won by a close margin, the first Democratic victory in Indiana since 1964.

Clinton did manage the feat of winning a plurality in exurban Chicago’s Porter County, which had previously voted Republican at every presidential election since that party was founded in 1854. In doing so he broke the second-last still-standing streak of voting Republican from that party’s first election in 1856, leaving Illinois’ Carroll County as the solitary county to have voted Republican at every presidential election since that party’s formation. (Carroll County would eventually have its streak broken by Barack Obama in 2008.)

, this is the last election in which the counties of Blackford, Clark, Crawford, Floyd, Gibson, Jefferson, Knox, Pike, Posey, Sullivan, Switzerland, and Warrick voted for the Democratic presidential nominee. This is also the last presidential election in which Hamilton County was the most Republican county in Indiana.

Results

Results by county

See also
 United States presidential elections in Indiana

Notes

References

Indiana
1996
1996 Indiana elections